Who Needs Enemies? is a 1983 studio album of improvised experimental music by Henry Kaiser and Fred Frith. It was recorded in October 1983, and was released on LP by Metalanguage Records later that year. It was Kaiser and Frith's second collaborative album, following on from their first, With Friends Like These in 1979.

In 1987 SST Records released With Enemies Like These, Who Needs Friends?, a CD with five tracks from With Friends Like These, seven tracks from Who Needs Enemies?, and four additional tracks from an unreleased live album by Frith and Kaiser. In 1999 Cuneiform Records released Friends & Enemies, a double-CD containing all the tracks from With Friends Like These and Who Needs Enemies?, plus unreleased live and studio material.

Background
Frith and Kaiser began working together when English avant-rock group Henry Cow, with whom Frith played guitar, lost their bass player. Frith decided to switch to bass guitar and recruited Kaiser to play guitar for the band. While Kaiser never joined the band permanently, he played guitar at several of their European concerts. Frith and Kaiser's work together resulted in a partnership that gave rise to two collaborative albums, With Friends Like These and Who Needs Enemies?, and several concert performances.

Track listing
All music by Henry Kaiser and Fred Frith,  except where noted.

Sources: Liner notes, Discogs, Fred Frith discography.

Personnel
Fred Frith – electric and acoustic guitars, 4 and 6 string bass guitars, LinnDrum programming, violin, marimba, piano, Casio 202 organ
Henry Kaiser – electric and acoustic guitars, 6 string bass guitar, LinnDrum programming, electric sitar, banjo, piano

Sources: Liner notes, Discogs, Fred Frith discography.

Sound
Recorded and mixed by Oliver DiCicco at Mobius Music, San Francisco
Produced by Henry Kaiser, Fred Frith and Oliver DiCicco
Mastered by Phil Brown
Photography by Tina Curran

Sources: Liner notes, Discogs, Fred Frith discography.

Further reading

References

1983 albums
Collaborative albums
Experimental music albums
Free improvisation albums
Fred Frith albums
Henry Kaiser (musician) albums
Metalanguage Records albums